This is a list of Native American place names in the U.S. state of Nebraska. These include state, county, townships, cities, towns, and villages.

State 

 Nebraska - The name of the state is derived from an Omaha name meaning "flat water." In the Omaha language the name is Nibthaska; ni, water, and bthaska, flat.

Counties 
 Red Willow - From the Dakota name "Caŋṡaṡa Wakpala", which literally means Red Osier Dogwood Creek; this shrub being abundant along its banks.
 Cheyenne
 Dakota
 Keya Paha County, Nebraska
 Loup - Named for the Skidi Pawnee, whose name means "wolf", which in French is loup.
 Nemaha
 Otoe
 Pawnee
 Sioux
 Keya Paha - Means "turtle hill", is descriptive of the small hills in its vicinity.

Villages, towns and cities 
 Anoka - A Dakota Indian word meaning "on both sides."
 Arapahoe
 Birdwood - A translation of the Dakota name Ziŋtka-c̣aŋ Wakpala (False Indigo Creek). False Indigo (Amorpha fruticosa), commonly grows along the stream and in Dakota is literally called "birdwood."
 Battle Creek - Named after a nearby stream where Nebraska volunteer militiamen were prepared to fight a battle against the Pawnee Indians that never happened.
 Barada - Named after Antoine Barada, a French-Omaha settler on the Nemaha Half-Breed Reservation.
 Blackbird - Blackbird is the English translation of the name Wash-ing-guhsah-ba, or Chief Blackbird of the Omahas who lived and died in the vicinity.
 Bone Creek Township, Butler County, Nebraska
 Brule - Named after the Brule tribe of the Teton Sioux. 
 Council Creek Township, Nance County, Nebraska
 Elkhorn Township, Dodge County, Nebraska
 Fontenelle - Named after Omaha chief Logan Fontenelle.
 Hyannis - Named after Hyannis, Massachusetts, which was named after Iyannough, a sachem of the Cummaquid tribe.
 Iowa Township, Holt County, Nebraska
 Kenesaw Township, Adams County, Nebraska
 Leshara - Named after Chief Petalesharo.
 Lodgepole - Named after a nearby creek that is named after a literal translation of the Dakota name, Tushu Wakpala.
 Logan Township, Adams County, Nebraska
 Logan Township, Antelope County, Nebraska
 Logan Township, Buffalo County, Nebraska
 Logan Township, Burt County, Nebraska
 Logan Township, Clay County, Nebraska
 Logan Township, Cuming County, Nebraska
 Logan Township, Dixon County, Nebraska
 Logan Township, Dodge County, Nebraska
 Logan Township, Gage County, Nebraska
 Logan Township, Kearney County, Nebraska
 Logan Township, Knox County, Nebraska
 Loup Ferry Township, Nance County, Nebraska
 Loup Township, Buffalo County, Nebraska
 Loup Township, Custer County, Nebraska
 Loup Township, Merrick County, Nebraska
 Loup Township, Platte County, Nebraska
 Mankota - Mankota is from the Dakota Indian word Maḳaṭo, meaning "blue earth". Named for Mankato, Minnesota.
 Minatare - From the Hidatsa word mirita'ri, meaning "crosses the water."
 Monowi - Meaning "flower", this town was so named because there were so many wild flowers growing in the vicinity.
 Nehawka - An approximation to the Omaha and Otoe Indian name of a nearby creek meaning "rustling water."
 Nemaha -  Named after the Nemaha River, based on an Otoe word meaning "swampy water."
 Niobrara - The Omaha and Ponca word for spreading water or spreading river.
 Oconee - Named for Oconee, Illinois. Oconee was the name of a Creek town.
 Oconto - A Menominee word meaning the "place of the pickerel." Named for Oconto, Wisconsin.
 Ogallala - named for the Oglala people.
 Omaha - Named for the Omaha people who lived nearby
 Oneida Township, Kearney County, Nebraska
 Osceola
 Ottercreek Township, Dixon County, Nebraska
 Leshara. Named after Petalesharo, a Pawnee chief.
 Platte Township, Buffalo County, Nebraska
 Platte Township, Butler County, Nebraska
 Platte Township, Dodge County, Nebraska
 Pohocco - A precinct in the northeastern part of Saunders county, the name derives from Pahuk, meaning headland or promontory, the Pawnee name of a prominent hill in the vicinity.
 Ponca
 Quinnebaugh Township, Burt County, Nebraska
 Red Cloud
 Rosalie - Named for Rosalie La Flesche, a daughter of Omaha chief Joseph La Flesche.<ref>Fitzpatrick, Lilian Linder A.M. (1925) Nebraska Place-Names. Lincoln, NE: University of Nebraska Studies in Language, Literature, and Criticism. p 140.</ref>
 Santee
 Sappa Township, Harlan County, Nebraska
 Saratoga Township, Holt County, Nebraska
 Sioux
 Skull Creek Township, Butler County, Nebraska
 St. Deroin - A ghost town on the former Nemaha Half-Breed Reservation founded by a French-Omaha settler who was killed near his trading post along the Missouri River.
 Tecumseh
 Tekamah - Located on the site of a historic Pawnee village, the surrounding hills were used for burying grounds and the highest point was used as a fire signal station. The origin of the name is not definitely known. 
 Tonawanda - Named for Tonawanda, New York.
 Unidilla - An Iroquois word meaning "place of meeting." Named after Unadilla, New York.
 Venango - An eastern Native American name in reference to a figure found on a tree, carved by the Erie.
 Waco - Named after Waco, Texas, which is the name of one of the divisions of the Tawokoni whose village stood on the site of Waco, Texas.
 Wahoo
 Weeping Water is a translation of the French "L'Eau qui Pleure", and has an interesting Native American legend connected with its name.
 Winnebago
 Wyoming - Derived from a corrupted Delaware word meaning "large plains" or "extensive meadows."
 Wyoming Township, Holt County, Nebraska
 Yutan - Named for an Otoe chief.

 Natural features 
 Arikaree River
 Big Blue River
 Big Horn Mountain
 Dakota Formation
 Elkhorn River
 Fontenelle Forest
 Guide Rock
 Keya Paha River
 Lake Wanahoo
 Little Blue River
 Lodgepole Creek
 Medicine Creek
 Missouri River
 Missouri River Valley
 Niobrara National Scenic River
 Niobrara River
 Nishnabotna River
 North Platte River
 Ogallala Aquifer
 Oglala National Grassland
 Pahuk
 Platte River
 Red Willow Creek
 South Platte River
 Standing Bear Lake

 Other places 
 Fontenelle Boulevard
 Fontenelle's Post
 Hotel Fontenelle
 Logan Fontenelle Housing Project

See also
 Native American tribes in Nebraska
 History of Nebraska
 French people in Nebraska

References

Bibliography
 Fitzpatrick, Lilian Linder A.M. (1925) Nebraska Place-Names. Lincoln, NE: University of Nebraska Studies in Language, Literature, and Criticism. p 140.
 Fontenelle, Henry. (1885) Indian Names of Streams and Localities. Translations and reports of the Nebraska State Historical Society, vol. 1, p. 76, 1885.
 Gilmore, Melvin R. (1919) Some Indian Place Names in Nebraska. Nebraska State Historical Society, vol. 19, pp. 130–139.

External links
Indian Place Names in New Jersey

 
Native Americans in Nebraska
Native American-related lists